Cryptolechia conata is a moth in the family Depressariidae. It was described by Strand in 1917. It is found in Taiwan.

References

Moths described in 1917
Cryptolechia (moth)